Patrick J. Flynn is a successful race horse trainer.  Among the winners that he has trained are:

Alalja, winner of:
1992 Debutante Stakes (Ireland)

Montelado, winner of:
1992 Champion Bumper
1993 Supreme Novices' Hurdle

Salmon Eile, winner of:
1993 Mooresbridge Stakes

Aries Girl, winner of:
1994 Champion INH Flat Race

Cheviot Amble
1994 Mooresbridge Stakes

Ger's Royal, winner of:
1996 Solonaway Stakes

Wandering Thoughts, winner of:
1996 Renaissance Stakes

French Ballerina, winner of:
1996 Diamond Stakes
1997 and 1998 Saval Beg Stakes
1998 Supreme Novices' Hurdle

Bahrain Storm, winner of:
2009 Galway Hurdle

She's Our Mark,  winner of:
2007 Desmond Stakes
2009 Meld Stakes
2010 Give Thanks Stakes

References

External links
 Official website of Pat Flynn Racing
 Go Racing - Pat Flynn

Living people
Year of birth missing (living people)